Tympanopleura piperata is a species of driftwood catfish of the family Auchenipteridae. It can be found on the Essequibo River, Guyana.

References

Fish described in 1912
Fish of Guyana
Fish of Venezuela
Taxa named by Carl H. Eigenmann